Celastrina iynteana, the Jyntea hedge blue, is a small butterfly found in India that belongs to the lycaenids or blues family.

Description
Male upperside: purplish blue or lilac of a deeper shade than in C. dilecta. Forewing: a much broader dusky-black terminal margin that widens at apex and is somewhat diffuse along its inner edge. In specimens of the dry-season brood there is a diffuse but prominent discal white patch. Hindwing: costa dusky brownish; termen with a comparatively narrow black border edged on the inner side by a more or less obscure subterminal series of black spots, each spot centred in a background which is slightly paler than the lilac ground colour. Underside: pale greyish white or bluish white, with the usual pale brown markings which are small, delicate and regular. Antenna, head, thorax and abdomen blackish brown, antennae ringed with white; beneath: palpi, thorax and abdomen white.

Female: "Upperside fore wing: all but the middle of the disc (which is white glossed with iridescent blue black; a discocellular black spot. Hind wing: blackish; white in the middle glossed with blue; along the veins irrorated with black scales; a submarginal series of pale lunules. Underside: both wings marked exactly as in the male." (de Nicéville)

Taxonomy
The butterfly was earlier known as Lycaenopsis jynteana (de Nicéville).

Range
It is found from Sikkim in India to Dawnas.

Cited references

See also
List of butterflies of India
List of butterflies of India (Lycaenidae)

References
  
 

Celastrina
Butterflies of Asia
Butterflies described in 1883